The 1884–85 international cricket season was from September 1884 to March 1885. The tour was generally known as Alfred Shaw's XI after its main organiser.

Season overview

January

England in Australia

References

International cricket competitions by season
1884 in cricket
1885 in cricket